Bedriaga's fringe-fingered lizard (Acanthodactylus bedriagai) is a species of lizard in the family Lacertidae. The species is endemic to Algeria.

Etymology
Both the specific name, bedriagai, and the common name are in honor of Russian herpetologist Jacques von Bedriaga.

Geographic range
A. bedriagai is native to northern Algeria, where it is found on the Hauts Plateaux and in the Aureus-Kabili Mountains.

Habitat

Reproduction
Acanthodactylus bedriagai is oviparous.

References

Further reading
Boulenger GA (1881). "On the Lizards of the Genera Lacerta and Acanthodactylus ". Proceedings of the Zoological Society of London 1881: 739–747 + Plates LXIII–LXIV. (Acanthodactylus bedriagæ, p. 746 + Plate LXIII, figures 1a–1e).
Lataste F (1881). "Diagnoses de reptiles nouveaux, 5. Acanthodactylus Bedriagai, n. sp." Le Naturaliste 3 (45): 357–359. (Acanthodactylus bedriagai, new species). (in French).
Salvador, Alfredo (1982). "A revision of the lizards of the genus Acanthodactylus (Sauria: Lacertidae)". Bonner Zoologische Monographien (16): 167. (Acanthodactylus bedriagai, pp. 85–88, Figures 42–44, Map 17). (in English, with an abstract in German).
Sindaco R, Jeremčenko VK (2008). The Reptiles of the Western Palearctic. 1. Annotated Checklist and Distributional Atlas of the Turtles, Crocodiles, Amphisbaenians and Lizards of Europe, North Africa, Middle East and Central Asia. (Monographs of the Societas Herpetologica Italica). Latina, Italy: Edizioni Belvedere. 580 pp. .

Acanthodactylus
Lacertid lizards of Africa
Reptiles of North Africa
Endemic fauna of Algeria
Reptiles described in 1881
Taxa named by Fernand Lataste
Taxonomy articles created by Polbot